The 2009 Spanish motorcycle Grand Prix was the third round of the 2009 Grand Prix motorcycle racing season. It took place on the weekend of 1–3 May 2009 at the Circuito de Jerez located in Jerez de la Frontera, Spain.

Report
In the MotoGP race, Valentino Rossi achieved his first win of the season to go top of the world championship standings, the world champion came home ahead of home favourite Dani Pedrosa, with Casey Stoner in third place. In the 250cc race, Hiroshi Aoyama capitalised on a late mistake of another home favourite, Álvaro Bautista, to take his first win since the 2007 Malaysian motorcycle Grand Prix. In the 125cc race, British rider Bradley Smith dominated the race to achieve his first victory at the 50th attempt, after title rivals Andrea Iannone and Julián Simón both crashed.

MotoGP classification

250 cc classification

125 cc classification

Championship standings after the race (MotoGP)
Below are the standings for the top five riders and constructors after round three has concluded.

Riders' Championship standings

Constructors' Championship standings

 Note: Only the top five positions are included for both sets of standings.

References

Spanish motorcycle Grand Prix
Spanish
motorcycle